Clotilde Crespo de Arvelo (Los Teques, Miranda, 19 September 1887 - 1959) was a Venezuelan poet and novelist. Affiliated with Centro Nacional de Damas Católicas, she lived at Plaza Sucre de Caracas. Her works include Impresiones de viaje por los Estados Unidos (1915), Flores de invernadero (1921), A traves de los Andes (1926), De los predios del Senor (1927), and Visiones de Europa (1928). She married Enrique Arvelo, South American agent for the Chalmers Automobile of Detroit, Michigan, US.

References

1887 births
1959 deaths
People from Los Teques
20th-century Venezuelan poets
Venezuelan women poets
20th-century Venezuelan women writers
20th-century Venezuelan novelists
Venezuelan women novelists